Harold MacKay Huskilson (March 25, 1920 – October 24, 2011) was a political figure in Nova Scotia, Canada. He represented Shelburne County in the Nova Scotia House of Assembly from 1970 to 1993 as a Liberal member.

Early life
He was a son of the late Lewis and Sarah (Lloyd) Huskilson. After graduation from Lockeport Regional High School, he attended Mount Allison University. His education was interrupted due to World War II until 1945. After the war he studied at the Renaud School of Embalming in New York City and graduated in 1946.

Entrance to politics
Huskilson made his way into a life of politics where he served on both the Shelburne Town Council and the Yarmouth Town Council. He resigned when he was elected to the Nova Scotia House of Assembly, and successfully held the seat for 23 years in Shelburne.

Personal life
He was married to Elsie, and they have two children, Elizabeth and Clifford. He died in 2011 at the age of 91.

References

1920 births
2011 deaths
Nova Scotia Liberal Party MLAs
People from Shelburne County, Nova Scotia
Nova Scotia municipal councillors
Canadian funeral directors
Canadian expatriates in the United States